"Beep" is a song recorded by American girl group the Pussycat Dolls for their debut studio album PCD (2005). It features will.i.am from the Black Eyed Peas, who composed the song with additional writing from Kara DioGuardi and Jeff Lynne, and additional production from Ron Fair. The song contains a sample of "Evil Woman" by Electric Light Orchestra. It was released as the third single from PCD on February 6, 2006, by A&M Records and Interscope Records.

Upon its release, "Beep" received mixed reviews from music critics. In the United States, the song failed to replicate the commercial success of its predecessors, peaking at number 13 on the Billboard Hot 100. Internationally, it peaked atop the charts in Belgium and New Zealand, while reaching the top ten in Australia, Austria, Canada, Czech Republic, France, Germany, Greece, Ireland, Italy, the Netherlands, Norway, Scotland, Switzerland, and the United Kingdom.

Background 

The Pussycat Dolls were originally a burlesque cabaret act formed in 1995 by choreographer Robin Antin. In 2004 after Antin negotiated a record deal with Interscope Records, The Pussycat Dolls transformed into a recording act under the supervision of Antin and then-A&M Records president and producer Ron Fair. After recruiting lead singer Nicole Scherzinger, they began to work with Fair who executive produced their 2005 debut album, PCD.

Music and lyrics 

"Beep" is a hip hop song written by William Adams, Kara DioGuardi, and Jeff Lynne, and composed in the key of G minor. The instrumental string hook is a sample of Electric Light Orchestra's "Evil Woman" (1975). Critics noted that the song was similar to The Black Eyed Peas' "My Humps" (2005), also produced and written by will.i.am. The staccato verse may be interpreted as explicit lyrics, clipped by a bleep censor, hence the title "Beep".

IGN's Spence D. noted that "the song is a mixed bag, tossing together slick strings for that orchestrated pop vibe, then mixing that up with a loping, though downplayed, funk groove. It's like two songs in one, though one of the songs feels like a throwback to '80s sterile pop." According to the sheet music published at Musicnotes.com by Sony/ATV Music Publishing, the "girl-empowerment song" has a time signature set in common time, with a tempo of 104 beats per minute. The melody is mainly composed with cinematic strings and features a sitar in the middle eighth, and uses stomping, custom-made beat.

Critical reception 
In his consumer guide for MSN Music, Robert Christgau selected  "Wait a Minute" as one of the album's highlights. Stephen Thomas Erlewine of AllMusic indicated the song as one of the standout tracks of the album. When reviewing for PCD, Lisa Haines described "Beep" as a standout tune. Nick Butler from Sputnikmusic wrote that the song may even be better than "Don't Cha." "'Beep', [is] pretty much the only thing here that stands up to 'Don't Cha' (it's quite possibly better, actually)." People's Chuck Arnold described the song as "naughty".

Sal Cinquemani from Slant Magazine wrote that the song is a "degrading material".  musicOMH's John Murphy described the song as "oddly sexless", "bland", "dull" and "just so damn safe." Senior editor of Billboard magazine, Chuck Taylor described the song as "cliched and overwrought." He ended his review writing "We had higher hopes." Miriam Zendle of Digital Spy described awarded the song 1 out 5 stars criticizing will.i.am for "making it sound pretentious and too try-hard" and noted that the "terrible rapping and incredibly short and repetitive sample the song" ruins any "attempt to make the song in any way sexual." She said the group miserably fail as they "go in yet another undefined direction."

Commercial performance
"Beep" debuted at number 93 on the US Billboard Hot 100, and eventually peaked at number 13, becoming the Pussycat Dolls' third consecutive top-20 hit, but failed to match the success of its predecessors "Don't Cha" and "Stickwitu", which both became top-five hits. In Canada, "Beep" was not a commercial success, peaking at number 48 on the Canadian Singles Chart and number 45 on the Canadian BDS Airplay Chart.

On the UK Singles Chart, "Beep" debuted and peaked at number two, with first-week sales of 29,212 copies. "Beep" was also a success in Ireland, where it peaked at number two on the Irish Singles Chart. In Europe, it peaked at number two on the European Hot 100 Singles, while performing best in Belgium, where it topped the singles chart for a week and became the Pussycat Dolls' second number-one single there after "Don't Cha". The song was also a commercial success in the Netherlands, where it peaked at number two for two consecutive weeks, becoming the group's third consecutive number-two song, following "Don't Cha" and "Stickwitu". Elsewhere, "Beep" reached the top five in Norway, top ten in Germany, Austria, Switzerland and France, and the top 20 in Sweden.

"Beep" was also successful across Oceania. In Australia, it debuted and peaked at number three for two non-consecutive weeks on the ARIA Singles Chart, becoming the group's third consecutive top-three hit there, and was certified gold by Australian Recording Industry Association (ARIA) for sales in excess of 35,000 copies. The song was ranked as the 24th best-seller of 2006 in Australia, and was one of the group's four songs to enter the ARIA Year-End Singles Chart for 2006, alongside "Stickwitu", "Buttons" and "I Don't Need a Man". In New Zealand, "Beep" debuted at number 25 on the RIANZ Singles Chart, and the following week ascended to its peak at number one, where it spent seven consecutive weeks, becoming the group's third consecutive number-one hit there. "Beep" ended as the year's second best-seller, and is the group's most successful single there to date.

Music video
 
The accompanying music video for "Beep" was directed by Benny Boom. It starts with Nicole Scherzinger meeting will.i.am in an elevator. will.i.am explains his attraction, to which Scherzinger replies by implying she doesn't care about him looking at her. She then enters the Pussycat Dolls' apartment and, concluding the chorus, the group begins a dance routine throughout the second verse. will.i.am then enters the room, but quickly exits as Carmit Bachar throws a bottle of water at him. The Pussycat Dolls are then seen at a nightclub and a dance break ensues. They are then seen in solo dance spots in front of a large set of speakers. Scherzinger, Bachar and Melody Thornton are seen with will.i.am, as the video comes to a close.

Track listings and formats

Australian and German CD maxi single
"Beep" (album version) – 3:49
"Don't Cha" (live) – 3:31
"Hot Stuff (I Want You Back)" (remix) – 4:08
"Beep" (music video)

UK CD maxi single
"Beep" (album version) – 3:49
"Hot Stuff (I Want You Back)" (remix) – 4:08
"Beep" (music video)	
"Sway" (music video)

German CD single
"Beep" (album version) – 3:49
"Don't Cha" (live) – 3:31

UK CD single
"Beep" (album version) – 3:49
"Hot Stuff (I Want You Back)" (remix) – 4:08

UK 12" vinyl
"Beep" (album version) – 3:49
"Beep" (instrumental) – 3:49
"Hot Stuff (I Want You Back)" (remix) – 4:08

Credits and personnel 
Credits adapted from the liner notes of PCD.

Sample
Contains a sample of the recording "Evil Woman", written by Jeff Lynne, and performed by Electric Light Orchestra.

Personnel
will.i.am – vocals, songwriting, production
JD Andrews – vocal recording
Charlie Bisharat – electric violin
Ariel Chobaz – assistant mix engineer
Kara DioGuardi – songwriting
Mike "Angry" Eleopoulos – additional engineering
Ron Fair – additional production, vocal production, arrangement, string arrangement and conduct, wurlitzer, 
Tal Herzberg – engineering, Pro Tools, additional programming, bass
The PCD Orchestra – strings
Dave "Hard Drive" Pensado – mixing
Bill Schnee – string recording

Charts

Weekly charts

Year-end charts

Certifications

Release history

See also 
 List of number-one singles from the 2000s (New Zealand)
 Ultratop 50 number-one hits of 2006

References

External links 
 Official website

2005 songs
2006 singles
Music videos directed by Benny Boom
Number-one singles in New Zealand
The Pussycat Dolls songs
Songs written by Kara DioGuardi
Will.i.am songs
Songs written by Jeff Lynne
Song recordings produced by will.i.am
Songs written by will.i.am
A&M Records singles